This is a list of butterflies of Iran. About 484 species are known from Iran.

Papilionidae

Pieridae

Nymphalidae

Libytheinae
Libythea celtis

Calinaginae
Calinaga buddha

Charaxinae
Charaxes jasius
Polyura athamas

Danainae

Heliconiinae

Apaturinae

Limenitidinae

Nymphalinae

Biblidinae
Ariadne ariadne
Ariadne merione

Cyrestinae

Satyrinae

Lycaenidae

Hesperiidae

See also
List of moths of Iran

References
Mohammadian, Hassan (2006) Biological Diversity of Lepidoptera in Iran. Shabpareh Publications.

Fauna of Iran
Butterflies
Iran
Iran
I